Widows is a 2011 Argentine dramatic comedy film directed by Marcos Carnevale. The film was the second highest grossing non-US film in Argentina in 2011.

Cast
 Graciela Borges as Elena
 Valeria Bertuccelli as Adela
 Rita Cortese as Esther
 Martín Bossi as Justina

References

External links
 

2011 films
2011 comedy-drama films
2010s Spanish-language films
Films about widowhood
LGBT-related comedy-drama films
Argentine LGBT-related films
Films shot in Buenos Aires
Films directed by Marcos Carnevale
2011 LGBT-related films
Argentine comedy-drama films
2010s Argentine films